The women's team sprint cross-country skiing competition in the freestyle technique at the 2010 Winter Olympics in Vancouver, Canada was held on 22 February at Whistler Olympic Park in Whistler, British Columbia.

The Swedish team of Lina Andersson and Anna Dahlberg (Olsson since 2008) were the defending Olympic champions when the technique was classical. The defending world champions were the Finnish duo of Virpi Kuitunen and Aino-Kaisa Saarinen, the defending Olympic bronze medalists, when the technique was also classical. Italy's team of Magda Genuin and Arianna Follis won the test event that took place at the Olympic venue on 18 January 2009. The last World Cup event in this format prior to the 2010 Games took place in Rybinsk, Russia on 24 January 2010 and was won by the German team of Stefanie Böhler and Evi Sachenbacher-Stehle.

Results

Semifinals
The semifinals took place at 10:45 and 11:10 PST.

Final
The following are the results of the event.

Defending Olympic champion Sweden won silver under a different team. Finland, the defending world champions, finished a disappointing eighth under a different team. Test event winners Italy finished fourth with the same team members. Germany, the last winners prior to the Olympics in this event, won gold with Nystad replacing Böhler.

References

External links
 2010 Winter Olympics results: Ladies' Team Sprint Free (semifinals), from https://web.archive.org/web/20100222080013/http://www.vancouver2010.com/ retrieved 2010-02-21.
 2010 Winter Olympics results: Ladies' Team Sprint Free (final), from https://web.archive.org/web/20100222080013/http://www.vancouver2010.com/ retrieved 2010-02-21.

Women's cross-country skiing at the 2010 Winter Olympics
Women's team sprint cross-country skiing at the Winter Olympics